Sterling Creek  may refer to:

 Sterling Creek (Georgia), a stream in Georgia
 Sterling Creek (Mohawk River tributary), a stream in New York
 Sterling Creek (Oregon), a stream in Oregon